Põlva Parish is a rural municipality in Põlva County, southeastern Estonia.

On 1 January 2009, it had a population of 3,882 and an area of 228.63 km².
In October 2013, the town of Põlva (formerly a separate municipality) was merged into Põlva Parish, becoming the centre of it. In 2017, as part of the administrative reform, the neighbouring Ahja, Laheda, Mooste and Vastse-Kuuste parishes were merged with Põlva Parish.

Settlements
Town Põlva

Small boroughs Ahja - Mooste - Vastse-Kuuste

Villages Aarna - Adiste - Akste - Andre - Eoste - Himma - Himmaste - Holvandi - Ibaste - Jaanimõisa - Joosu - Kaaru - Kadaja - Kanassaare - Karilatsi - Kastmekoja - Kauksi - Kiidjärve - Kiisa - Kiuma - Koorvere - Kosova - Kähri - Kärsa - Lahe - Laho - Leevijõe - Logina - Loko - Lootvina - Lutsu - Mammaste - Meemaste - Metste - Miiaste - Mustajõe - Mustakurmu - Mõtsküla - Naruski - Nooritsmetsa - Orajõe - Padari - Partsi - Peri - Pragi - Puskaru - Puuri - Rasina - Roosi - Rosma - Savimäe - Soesaare - Suurküla - Suurmetsa - Säkna - Säässaare - Taevaskoja - Terepi - Tilsi - Tromsi - Tännassilma - Uibujärve - Valgemetsa - Valgesoo - Vana-Koiola - Vanaküla - Vanamõisa - Vardja - Viisli - Vooreküla

Religion

References

External links